Ali Akbar Qasimi was elected to represent Ghazni province in Afghanistan's Wolesi Jirga, the lower house of its National Legislature, in 2005.
He is a member of the Hazara ethnic group.  He is a General in the Afghan National Army, and was a former commander of the 14th Division, which was garrisoned in Ghazni.

References 

Living people
1954 births
Politicians of Ghazni Province
Hazara politicians
Members of the House of the People (Afghanistan)
Afghan warlords